Yisroel ben Shmuel Ashkenazi of Shklov (c. 1770 – May 22, 1839) was a Lithuanian Jewish Talmudist, one of a group of Talmudical scholars of Shklov who were attracted to Vilna by Rabbi Elijah ben Solomon Zalman, known as the Vilna Gaon (1720–97). He was one of "the last arrivals," and attended upon the Gaon as a disciple for less than a year.

He gained the Vilna Gaon's confidence, and was chosen to arrange for publication the Gaon's commentary to the first two parts of the Shulchan Aruch. That on the Orach Chaim was published in Shklov in 1803. Ashkenazi also published his master's notes to the tractate Shekalim of the Jerusalem Talmud, with a commentary of his own, under the title Taklin Chadtin (Minsk, 1812). Later he emigrated to Ottoman Syria and became the head of the German and Polish congregations of Safed and then of Jerusalem. He was there surnamed "Ashkenazi" (the "German"), a name applied to all Jews of German extraction, in contradistinction to the Sephardim, who came originally from Spain or Portugal.

After a residence of several years in the Holy Land, Ashkenazi went to Europe as a ShaDaR (emissary of the rabbis), to collect alms for the poor Palestinian Jews residing at the Yishuv haYashan, and in that capacity he traveled through Lithuania and other parts of what was then Russian Empire.

On his return to Palestine he wrote his chief work, Pe'at ha-Shulchan, which is intended as a sort of supplement to the Shulchan Aruch, supplying all the agricultural laws obligatory only in the Holy Land, omitted by rabbi Joseph Caro in his code. He also incorporated in this book the notes of Elijah of Vilna (the Gaon) to the tractate Zera'im, the first order of the Mishnah, and gave in addition a voluminous commentary of his own which he called Beit Yisrael. The work was published in Safed in 1836 by the printing-house of Yisrael ben Avraham Back.

Ashkenazi is also the author of Nachalah u-Menuchah, a collection of responsa mentioned in the work above. An account of his rabbinate of Jerusalem is given in Mendel ben Aaron's Kore ha-'Ittim (Vilna, 1840).  Ashkenazi died at Tiberias on May 22, 1839.

References
Jewish Encyclopedia bibliography
Heschel Lewin,  'Aliyyat Eliyahu, p. 74, Wilna, 1854, and Stettin, 1862;
Fuenn, Keneset Yisrael, s.v. Israel ben Samuel;
Fürst, Bibl. Jud. i. 63;
Eliezer of Botushan, Ḳin'at Soferim, 1892, s.v. Elijah Wilna.

References

1770s births
1839 deaths
19th-century Lithuanian rabbis
Ashkenazi rabbis in Ottoman Palestine
Rabbis in Safed
19th-century rabbis from the Ottoman Empire
Burials at the Old Jewish Cemetery, Tiberias
People from Shklow